HDML may refer to:
 Handheld Device Markup Language
 Harbour Defence Motor Launch